Devon Gearhart (born May 5, 1995) is an American actor.

Early life 
Gearhart was born and raised in Atlanta, Georgia, and began acting at the age of seven, landing national commercials with Burger King, PBS, Pizza Hut and the Cartoon Network. Gearhart's movie debut came in 2004 when he landed the role of Young Bobby in Bobby Jones: Stroke of Genius. He currently lives in Los Angeles, California.

Career 
Gearhart appeared in the television movies The Brooke Ellison Story directed by Christopher Reeve and Warm Springs, playing the son of Franklin Delano Roosevelt.

Gearhart landed lead roles in two independent films, with the stories of each film being told through the eyes of his characters. The first of the films was Canvas, in which he starred opposite Marcia Gay Harden and Joe Pantoliano. The second film was Dog Days of Summer in which he starred opposite Will Patton and Colin Ford. Earlier in 2005, Gearhart had starred as Jake in the Life Is My Movie production Little Men.

Gearhart portrayed Naomi Watts' and Tim Roth's son in Michael Haneke's Funny Games, which premiered at the 2008 Sundance Film Festival. Gearhart also appeared in Clint Eastwood's Changeling in 2008.

In 2009, he appeared in the Robert Rodriguez film, Shorts. In addition to films, Gearhart has appeared in television shows including Lost and Law & Order: SVU.

Filmography

Television

References

External links

1995 births
American male film actors
American male child actors
Living people
Male actors from Atlanta